The Bank of Rogers Building is a historic commercial building at 114 South 1st Street in Rogers, Arkansas.  It is an elegant two story Renaissance Revival structure with a limestone front.  There are essentially two facades, one of which is set back under a large Roman arch, which forms the major element of the outer facade.  This arch begins on the first level with square outer pillars and round inner ones, and is flanked on the second level by marble pilasters, which rise to support a projecting entablature and pediment.  The inner facade has the main entrance under a segmented arch, with a pair of sash windows under a round arch on the second level.

The building was listed on the National Register of Historic Places in 1980.  At that time it house the Rogers Historical Museum, which has since moved to modern facilities on 2nd Street.

See also
National Register of Historic Places listings in Benton County, Arkansas

References

Bank buildings on the National Register of Historic Places in Arkansas
Renaissance Revival architecture in Arkansas
Commercial buildings completed in 1906
Buildings and structures in Rogers, Arkansas
1906 establishments in Arkansas
National Register of Historic Places in Benton County, Arkansas
Individually listed contributing properties to historic districts on the National Register in Arkansas